Chinapenetretus is a genus of ground beetles in the family Carabidae. There are about nine described species in Chinapenetretus, found in China.

Species
These nine species belong to the genus Chinapenetretus:
 Chinapenetretus cangensis Zamotajlov, 2002
 Chinapenetretus impexus Zamotajlov & Sciaky, 1999
 Chinapenetretus impressus Zamotajlov & Sciaky, 1999
 Chinapenetretus kryzhanovskii Zamotajlov & Sciaky, 1999
 Chinapenetretus potanini (Kurnakov, 1963)
 Chinapenetretus reticulatus (Zamotajlov, 1990)
 Chinapenetretus salebrosus Zamotajlov & Sciaky, 1999
 Chinapenetretus wittmeri Zamotajlov & Sciaky, 1999
 Chinapenetretus yunnanus (Fairmaire, 1886)

References

Carabidae